Hājar, known as Hagar in the Hebrew Bible, was the wife of the patriarch and Islamic prophet Ibrāhīm (Abraham) and the mother of Ismā'īl (Ishmael). She is a revered woman in the Islamic faith. According to Muslim belief, she was the daughter of the king of Egypt who gifted her to Ibrahim's wife Sarah. Although not mentioned by name in the Qur'an, she is referenced and alluded to via the story of her husband. She eventually settled in the Desert of Paran, seen as the Hejaz in the Islamic view, with her son Ishmael. Hajar is honoured as an especially important matriarch of monotheism, as Ishmael was the ancestor of Muhammad.

Narrative 
Abraham was childless. He was a prophet of God and, having left his native land, he was concerned about who would take the prophetic office after him, and whether he would be a father one day. His wife's servant Hagar, who was gifted to her, was given to Abraham to bear a child. According to modern research, Hagar was not a concubine but a princess, the daughter of the king of Egypt. Hagar subsequently bore a child who would grow to be righteous and ready to suffer and endure. Hagar named him Ismail, meaning "God has heard".

Islamic scholar Muhammad Saed Abdul-Rahman states the following using the Arabic name Haajar for Hagar; "After Haajar gave birth to Ismaa’eel, Saarah began to feel jealous, so she asked Ibrahim to send them away from her. Allah revealed to Ibrahim that he should take Haajar and the infant Ismaa’eel and take them to Makkah. So he took them and left Haajar and her child Ismaa’eel in a bleak, isolated place in which there was no water, then he left them and went back to Canaan (Parts of present day - Lebanon, Syria, Jordan, Israel and Palestinian territories). Haajar said to him, 'For whom are you leaving us in this forsaken valley?' But Ibrahim went and left her, and she said, 'Has Allah commanded you to do this?” He said, 'Yes.' She said, 'Then Allah will not cause us to be lost.'"

Abraham submitted to the command of his Lord and patiently bore the separation from his wife and child. Then he turned towards where they were at the Sacred House and prayed for them in the following words (interpretation of the meaning): 
'O our Lord! I have made some of my offspring to dwell in an uncultivatable valley by Your Sacred House (the Kaaba ('Cube') at Mecca) in order, O our Lord, that they may perform As-Ṣalāt. So fill some hearts among men with love towards them, and (O Allah) provide them with fruits so that they may give thanks' Qur'an, Ibraaheem 14:37

Because of the scarcity of water in the desert, it was not long before both mother and son suffered immense thirst. Thus, Hagar ran between the Safa and Marwa hills in search of water for her son. After the seventh run between the two hills, an angel appeared before her. He helped her and told her that God had heard Ishmael's crying and would provide them with water. At that point, God caused a spring to burst forth from the ground, where Ishmael's heel lay, and thereafter Mecca became known for its excellence and abundance of water. The well was subsequently named Zamzam, and become a holy source of water.

Status 
Hagar is presented as a bondswoman in the Bible and some Islamic sources. Pakistani scholar Muhammad Ashraf Chheenah attributes the claim to Christian and Jewish sources and identifies her as the daughter of an Egyptian king who gifted her to Abraham.

Legacy 
Hagar is honoured by Muslims as a wise, brave and pious woman as well as the believing mother of the Adnani Arab people. The incident of her running between Al-Safa and Al-Marwah hills is remembered by Muslims when they perform their Ḥajj (major pilgrimage) at Mecca. Part of the pilgrimage is to run seven times between the hills, in commemoration of Hagar's courage and faith in God as she searched for water in the desert (which is believed to have then miraculously appeared from the Zamzam Well) and to symbolize the celebration of motherhood in Islam. To complete the task, some Muslims also drink from the Zamzam Well and take some of it back to their homes.

References 

People of the Quran
Hagar
Hebrew Bible people in Islam